James Hervey  (c. 1751 in London – 1824) was an English physician and pioneer of smallpox vaccination in London.

After education at a school at Northampton and then at home under a private tutor, James Hervey, at age 16, matriculated on 17 November 1767 at Queen's College, Oxford. He graduated there A.B. 1771, A.M. 1774, M.B. 1777, and M.D. 1781. Hervey was elected physician to Guy's Hospital in 1779, was admitted a Candidate of the Royal College of Physicians in 1781, and was elected F.R.C.P. in 1782. He regularly practised for some years at Tunbridge Wells during the summer season.

Hervey was Gulstonian lecturer in 1783, Harveian orator in 1785, and Lumleian lecturer from 1789 to 1811. He was the National Vaccine Establishment's first appointed registrar. He died in early 1824.

In 1812, Hervey reported for the Board of the National Vaccine Establishment that during the year 1811 the surgeons appointed by the Board's authority to nine stations in London vaccinated 3,148 people and distributed 23,794 effective doses of vaccine lymph to the public.

References

1751 births
1824 deaths
People from Northampton
Fellows of the Royal College of Physicians
Alumni of The Queen's College, Oxford
19th-century English medical doctors
18th-century English medical doctors
Physicians of Guy's Hospital
Vaccinologists
British immunologists
Smallpox vaccines